Ipsy is a monthly subscription service which provides subscribers with a makeup bag of five cosmetics samples. The products include skincare items, perfumes, nail and skin products, and makeup products based upon users' preferences.

History 

Ipsy was co-founded in 2011 by YouTube beauty vlogger Michelle Phan, Marcelo Camberos, who joined the company as CEO from Funny or Die and Jennifer Jaconetti Goldfarb, who joined from Bare Escentuals.
The company's initial business model was tested in a beta site called myglam.com in December 2011. The subscription service retailed at $12 per month, including a bag of cosmetic samples and was later launched to the public in September 2012 as ipsy.com.

The company's growth model is to drive subscriptions through the social influence of Phan and other associated vloggers. When it launched in 2012, Phan was the face of the brand along with beauty vloggers Bethany Mota, Promise Phan, Jessica Harlow, and Andrea Brooks.  By February 2016 the company had 10,000 vloggers who contributed one or two videos a month dedicated to the subscription service. At the time, Goldfarb stated "There are hundreds if not millions of beauty content creators online. We want all of them."
Ipsy does not buy the samples that go into the monthly sample bags; cosmetic companies provide them for free as marketing and in exchange for the feedback that Ipsy gathers from subscribers. Ipsy also does not pay vloggers to promote the subscription service through their social media but instead offers mentoring, access to studio space, and the association with Phan and Ipsy. As of 2016 Ipsy has spent almost no money on advertising. It does, however, host and sponsor an annual beauty convention, Generation Beauty, where cosmetics companies, bloggers, and the public can meet.

In June 2015, Ipsy opened a video production co-working space for vloggers associated with the brand in Santa Monica, California. At the studio, vloggers can use the provided equipment to produce content for their social media platforms and receive mentoring.
In September 2015, Ipsy raised a $100 million Series B round of funding from TPG Growth and Sherpa Capital and the company was valued at about $800M; before then it had only raised about $3M in seed and Series A funding.

As of September 2017, Ipsy announced that it had around 3 million subscribers.

In September 2017, Ipsy launched an e-commerce app called Shopper with a rewards system open to subscribers to earn cash back on the purchases they make from the brands included in the monthly boxes. While most of the products on Ipsy Shopper are eligible for cash back, there are certain products that will not be able to earn cash back on. These products will not show an Ipsy Cash Back percentage banner. Michelle Phan left the company in 2017.

Explaining for her leave, Michelle Phan claimed that it was a daring act "to realize [her] vision of building a global beauty brand with innovative R&D and increased vertical integration."

See also 
 Social media marketing
Beauty YouTuber

References

External links 
 

Subscription services
2011 establishments in California
Cosmetics companies of the United States
American companies established in 2011

 ipsy login steps